This is a list of footballers who have played for Tatung F.C. It is a tradition in Tatung that new players do not replace old players' shirt numbers in honor of the club founders.

Tatung F.C.
Association football player non-biographical articles